NEPC may refer to:
National Education Policy Center of the University of Colorado at Boulder.
NEPC India (Natural Energy Processing Company) Ltd., a corporate group based in Chennai founded by Ravi Prakash Khemka.
NEPC Airlines, a former airline belonging to the NEPC group.